Rhodamine 6G  is a highly fluorescent rhodamine family dye. It is often used as a tracer dye within water to determine the rate and direction of flow and transport.  Rhodamine dyes fluoresce and can thus be detected easily and inexpensively with instruments called fluorometers. Rhodamine dyes are used extensively in biotechnology applications such as fluorescence microscopy, flow cytometry, fluorescence correlation spectroscopy and ELISA.

Forms

Rhodamine 6G usually comes in three different forms. Rhodamine 6G chloride is a bronze/red powder with the chemical formula C28H31ClN2O3. Although highly soluble, this formulation is very corrosive to all metals except stainless steel. Other formulations are less soluble, but also less corrosive. Rhodamine 6G perchlorate (C28H31ClN2O7) comes in the form of red crystals, while rhodamine 6G tetrafluoroborate (C28H31BF4N2O3) appears as maroon crystals.

Solubility
Butanol (40 g/L), ethanol (80 g/L), methanol (400 g/L), propanol (15 g/L), MEG (50 g/L), DEG ( 100 g/L), TEG (100 g/L), isopropanol (15 g/L), ethoxyethanol (25 g/L), methoxyethanol (50 g/L), dipropylene glycol (30 g/L), PEG (20 g/L).

Laser dye
 
Rhodamine 6G is also used as a laser dye, or gain medium, in dye lasers, and is pumped by the second (532 nm) harmonic from an Nd:YAG laser, nitrogen laser, or argon ion laser. The dye has a remarkably high photostability, high fluorescence quantum yield (0.95), low cost, and its lasing range has close proximity to its absorption maximum (approximately 530 nm). The lasing range of the dye is 570 to 660 nm with a maximum at 590 nm.

See also
Rhodamine
Rhodamine B
Dye laser
Laser dyes

References 

Staining dyes
Laser gain media
Xanthenes
Benzoate esters